is a train station in Sasaguri, Fukuoka Prefecture, Japan. It is operated by Kyushu Railway Company (JR Kyushu).

Lines
JR Kyushu
Sasaguri Line (Fukuhoku Yutaka Line)

Layout
It is a ground level station with two platforms and three tracks.

Tracks

Adjacent stations 

|-
|colspan=5 style="text-align:center;" |JR Kyūshū

History
 June 19, 1904: Opened by the private company Kyushu Tetsudo.
 July 1, 1907: Brought under state control.
 May 25, 1968: Sasaguri Line completion.
 April 1, 1987: Following privatisation of JNR it came under the control of JR Kyushu.
 October 6, 2001: Whole of Sasaguri Line electrification.

History
When the Kyushu Railway was nationalized on 1 July 1907, Japanese Government Railways (JGR) took over control of the station. On 12 October 1909, the station became part of the Sasaguri Line. With the privatization of Japanese National Railways (JNR), the successor of JGR, on 1 April 1987, JR Kyushu took over control of the station.

Passenger statistics
In fiscal 2016, the station was used by an average of 4,786 passengers daily (boarding passengers only), and it ranked 43rd among the busiest stations of JR Kyushu.

External links
 Sasaguri Station (JR Kyushu)

References

Railway stations in Japan opened in 1904
Railway stations in Fukuoka Prefecture
Stations of Kyushu Railway Company